The list of lakes in Bavaria shows notable lakes in Bavaria, Germany, listed by their German name. In total 109 lakes.

A

Abtsdorfer See
Aindlinger Baggersee
Alatsee
Alpsee
Altmühlsee
Ammersee
Auensee
Großer Arbersee
Kleiner Arbersee
Autobahnsee Augsburg

B

Bannwaldsee
Barmsee
Bergfeldsee
Biber
Birkensee
Blaue Lache
Lake Constance (Bodensee, international)
Großer Brombachsee
Kleiner Brombachsee

C

Chiemsee

D

Dennenloher See
Derchinger Baggersee
Dornautalsperre
Dreiburgensee
Dutzendteich

E

Eggstätter Seen
Eibsee
Ellertshäuser See
Eschacher Weiher

F

Fasaneriesee
Feisnitz Reservoir
Feldmochinger See
Ferchensee
Feringasee
Fichtsee
Fichtelsee
Forggensee
Franconian Lake District
Frauenau Reservoir
Freibergsee
Frickenhäuser See
Fridolfinger See
Friedberger Baggersee
Froschgrundsee
Funtensee

G

Großer Alpsee
Großer Arbersee
Grünsee
Guggersee

H

Hahnenkammsee
Heimstettener See
Hintersee
Höglwörther See
Höllensteinsee
Hopfensee

I
Ilsesee

K

Kaisersee
Kirchsee
Kleiner Arbersee
Kleinhesseloher See
Kochelsee
Königssee
Kuhsee

L
Langenprozelten Pumped Storage Station
Langwieder See
Latschensee
Lautersee
Lerchenauer See
Luttensee
Lödensee
Lußsee

M
Mittersee
Murner See

N
Nadisee
Niedersonthofener See

O
Oberrieder Weiher
Obersee
Osterseen

P
Pilsensee

R
Rachelsee
Radersdorfer Baggersee
Rannasee
Rappensee
Riemer See
Riessersee

S

Sarchinger Weiher
Schliersee
Schwaltenweiher
Schwansee
Seehamer See
Seeon Lakes (Seeoner Seen)
Simssee
Soiernseen
Soinsee
Spitzingsee
Staffelsee
Lake Starnberg (Starnberger See)
Steinberger See
Steinsee
Stempflesee
Sylvensteinspeicher

T

Tegernsee
Tüttensee

W
Waginger See
Walchensee
Weißensee
Weitmannsee
Weitsee
Weßlinger See
Wiesbüttsee
Wöhrder See
Wörthsee

See also

External links

 
Bavaria
Lak